Mocchi may refer to:
 Mocchi (singer) (born 1990), Uruguayan singer and composer
 Kaori Mochida (born 1978), Japanese singer
  (1871–1955), Italian politician and impresario, former owner of the Teatro dell'Opera di Roma
 Mocchi, or Motoharu Iwadera (born 1981), member of Japanese band Sakanaction

See also 
 Mochi (disambiguation)